Hammarby Talang FF, more commonly known as Hammarby TFF or HTFF for short, is a Swedish football club from Stockholm. Originally founded in 2003, the club was dissolved in 2011, before being re-incorporated in 2016 and again in 2021.

Competing in Ettan, the domestic third tier, it is the feeder team of Hammarby IF in Allsvenskan and is focused on providing experience and training for young players.

The club holds home matches at the stadium Hammarby IP in the district of Södermalm, holding 3,700 spectators. 

Its colours are black and yellow, as an homage to its latest predecessor IK Frej. The same colours are worn by HTFF's parent club Hammarby IF as an alternative jersey.

Hammarby Talang FF is affiliated with the Stockholms Fotbollförbund (Stockholm Football Association).

History

2003–2011: First edition
The team was founded in 2003 when Pröpa SK was renamed and reformed to Hammarby Talang FF. The last coach was Roger Franzén. The team played their final season of 2011 in the third tier of Swedish football, in Division 1 Norra, before being dissolved.

2016–2020: Second edition
In 2016, Hammarby IF decided to form a new affiliated club with the name Hammarby Talang FF, focused on youth football for players between the age of 15 and 19. In 2019, they also established a senior team, that played in Division 5 and Division 4, Sweden's seventh and sixth tier, for two seasons before being discontinued. The squads mostly consisted of older amateur players.

2021–: Third edition
On 3 February 2021, the senior team of IK Frej changed its legal name to Stockholm TFF. After several years of financial difficulties, the board of IK Frej decided to withdraw from Division 1, the domestic third tier, to join Division 4 instead. Affiliated club Hammarby IF in Allsvenskan, which had provided resources in the form of funds and loaned players to IK Frej for several years, then decided to continue operations in a new form. The club's vision is to provide experience and training for young players, who can be temporarily loaned out and recalled. The new name Stockholm TFF was, however, not accepted by the Stockholm Football Association since its abbreviation, STFF, was too similar to their own. On 4 March 2021, the board instead changed its name to Hammarby Talangfotbollsförening Herrfotboll, or Hammarby Talang FF for short, which was then re-incorporated.

Players

First-team squad

Management

Season-to-season
Up until the 2011 season, Hammarby TFF had the following results:

Attendances
Up until the 2011 season, Hammarby TFF had the following average attendances:

References

 
Talang
Football clubs in Stockholm
Association football clubs established in 2003
Phoenix clubs (association football)